Historically, "work spouse" is a phrase, mostly in American English, referring to a co-worker, with whom one shares a special relationship, having bonds similar to those of a marriage. Early references suggest that a work spouse may not just be a co-worker, but can also be someone in a similar field who the individual works closely with from a partnering company. 

A work spouse has been defined as “a special, platonic friendship with a work colleague characterized by a close emotional bond, high levels of disclosure and support, and mutual trust, honesty, loyalty, and respect”.

A "work spouse" is also referred to as "workplace spouse", "work wife", or "office husband", "work husband", or "wusband".

Social documentation
In one 2006 survey, 32% of workers said they had an "office husband" or "office wife".

A CNN Money article characterizes the relationship as having the "immediate intimacy [of marriage] without commitment."

One source characterizes the relationships as "platonic, close, opposite-sex couplings, with no strings attached." The phrase is, however, sometimes used for same-sex relationships.

Sociological and psychological implications
With so many of the quality hours of a day spent at work, having someone there who has an intuitive understanding of the pressures, personalities, interactions, and underlying narratives of the workplace society can add safety and comfort to what can otherwise be an alienating environment.

"Work marriage" appears to be a genuinely caring relationship fostered by the propinquity effect and associated with love-like feelings and possibly limerence. Some "work spouses" admit that while sexual attraction between them is present, it is rarely acted upon, but rather "channeled" into a productive collaboration.

This new social relationship is unique to the social milieu of the late 20th and early 21st century; and as a result the sociological and psychological implications this new social relationship poses to Western society's traditional notions of love, marriage, and friendship have not yet been fully explored.

Historical uses
The phrase "office wife" was common during the 1930s, popularized by Faith Baldwin's 1930 novel The Office Wife and its film adaptation. But the concept, if not the exact phrase, is much older: a 1933 New York Times article says:

"Office wife" carried the connotation of subordinance or subservience. As feminism began to take hold in the 1980s, it became common to hear that "Many secretaries resent the 'office wife' syndrome," referring to being asked to do such things as paying personal bills for a boss, picking up everything from dry cleaning, or dusting the office. "I'm getting paid as a secretary," said one secretary. "I'm not a personal servant."

Modern usage
According to Timothy Noah, writing in Slate, "The terms 'work wife,' 'work husband,' and 'work marriage' entered the national lexicon in 1987, when the writer David Owen wrote an Atlantic essay describing a particular platonic intimacy that frequently arises between male and female employees working in close proximity."

An executive coach and workplace adviser noted that as of 2005, "The workplace spouse is a relatively new concept ... Many people don't know what to make of it yet. It is only within the last 25 years that men and women have become peers in the workplace ... This new camaraderie, coupled with long hours spent at work, has caused a fundamental shift in the way people conduct business and interact with one another."

Television
Male–female television news co-anchors are sometimes referred to as "TV spouses" for the way they work together and present themselves side by side. "I've known Don for 14 years," said Minneapolis anchor Amelia Santaniello of her co-anchor. "We like to joke he was my first TV husband." Miami anchor Pam Giganti called her co-anchor "my partner and my TV husband for the past eight years." Anchor Mark Bradshaw writes, "I've gone through many 'TV wives'. I can't even remember all their names. Bad husband."

Actress Ana Gasteyer refers to actor Chris Parnell as her "wusband", or work husband, whom she has played the wife of in The Groundlings, in Saturday Night Live sketches, and on Suburgatory: "I have my husband, Charlie, and then Chris Parnell ... He's my work husband, my 'wusband.'"

On Live with Kelly and Ryan, the co-hosts Kelly Ripa and Ryan Seacrest frequently talk about their work spouse dynamic on their show.

See also
 Emotional affair
 Queerplatonic relationship

References

Interpersonal relationships
English-language idioms
Workplace